SS Sapona was a concrete-hulled cargo steamer that ran aground near Bimini during a hurricane in 1926. The wreck of the ship is easily visible above the water, and is both a navigational landmark for boaters and a popular dive site.  It is also a good place to see tropical fish attracted to it as an artificial reef.

History 
Sapona was built by the Liberty Ship Building Company of Wilmington, North Carolina, founded by Max Shoolman of Boston, MA,  as part of a fleet of concrete ships authorized by Woodrow Wilson during World War I, because steel was in short supply. Like many others in the fleet, the ship was completed after the end of the war, and Sapona was sold for scrap to Carl Fisher, one of the developers of Miami Beach. It was initially used as a casino and later for oil storage. The 1936 book Miami Millions claims that Mr. Fisher took it out to sea and sank it, but it was in fact purchased in 1924 by Bruce Bethel.

Bethel moved the ship to Bimini, using it as a warehouse for alcohol during the era of Prohibition. Bethel also intended to use the ship as a floating nightclub, although this plan never came to fruition. In 1926 the ship ran aground in a hurricane and broke apart.

During World War II, the wreck was used for target practice by the U.S. Army Air Corps and U.S. Navy. Flight 19 vanished while returning from a bombing run to Sapona and the nearby Hens and Chickens shoals.

Little concrete is left on the hull because of the effects of bombing and weathering.

In popular culture 
The wreck itself and the surrounding area is a popular site for scuba divers and snorkelers.

The ship was used as a backdrop in the 1977 horror film Shock Waves. It was also figured as a key setting in Ian Fleming's novel Thunderball.

References

External links
 - Link Broken

Shipwrecks in the Atlantic Ocean
Merchant ships of the United States
Maritime incidents in 1926
Concrete ships
Bimini
Design 1070 ships